Roger Svanberg (born 27 April 1943) is a Swedish curler.

Teams

References

External links
 
Air Canada Silver Broom 1976 World Curling Championship - Perfect Duluth Day

Living people
1943 births
Swedish male curlers